At the turn of the century in 1900 the Salvation Army in the United Kingdom was well-established, with corps (Salvation Army term for local churches) all over the country.  Here is a list of corps in 1900.

A "circle corps" was a corps which was based in a number of villages, and the officer in charge being responsible for a number of centres which ranged from back kitchens and outhouses, to barns and to actual Salvation Army buildings.

A "Battery" was a horse-drawn cart staffed by two single officers, who were in effect mobile evangelists of their day.

B
 Bedlington
 Birkenhead (1,2 and 3)
 1 (Central), 
 2 (Bidston), 
 3 (Park),  
 Brighton Battery
 Bristol Battery
Brighton Congress Hall
Brighton Edward Street

C
 Cambridge Battery
 Canterbury Battery
 Carmarthen
 Cornwall Battery

D
 Dalbeattie
 Dalkeith
 Dalston
 Dalton-in-Furness
 Darleston
 Darlington
 Dartford
 Dartmouth
 Darwen
 Daventry
 Dawley
 Dawlish
 Deal
 Deddington
 Denaby
 Denbigh
 Denby Dale
 Denton
 Deptford
 Deptford Slums
 Derby 1,2 and 3
 Derry
 Devizes
 Devon Battery
 Devonport 1 (Devonport Morice Town) and 2 (Devonport Granby Street)
 Dewsbury 1 and 2
 Diss
 Dockhead Slums
 Doncaster
 Dorking
 Dorset Battery
 Douglas
 Dover
 Downham Circle
 Driffield
 Droitwich
 Drury Lane Slums
 Dublin 1,2 and 3
 Dudley
 Dudley Hill
 Dumbarton
 Dumfries
 Dundee 1,2,3 and 4
 Dundee Slums
 Dunfermline
 Dungannon
 Dunoon
 Dunstable
 Durham

E
 Ealing
 Earlestown
 Earls Barton
 Earlston Circle
 Easington Lane
 Easingwold
 Eastbourne
 East Dereham
 East Dulwich
 East Finchley
 East Grinstead
 East Ham
 East Hendred
 Eastleigh
 East Peckham
 East Rudham
 Eastwood
 Eaton Bray
 Ebbw Vale
 Eccles
 Eckington
 Edenbridge
 Edgware
 Edinburgh 1, 2, 3, 4 and 5
 Edinburgh Slums
 Edmonton
 Elgin
 Ely
 Englefield
 Enniskillen
 Eston Mines
 Evesham
 Exeter
 Exmouth

F
 Fakenham
 Falkirk
 Falmouth
 Farcet
 Fareham
 Faringdon
 Farnborough
 Farnworth
 Fauldhouse
 Faversham
 Felixstowe
 Felling
 Feltham
 Fenton
 Fenny Stratford
 Ferndale
 Findochty
 Fintona
 Fishponds
 Fleetwood
 Folkestone
 Fordingbridge
 Forest Gate
 Forest Hill
 Forfar
 Forres
 Framlingham
 Frampton Cotterell
 Fraserburgh
 Freshwater

G
 Gainsborough
 Galashiels
 Garforth
 Gateshead 1,2 and 3
 Gawthorpe
 Gilfach Goch
 Gilford
 Glanamon
 Glasgow 1,2,3,4,5,6,7,8,9,10,11,12,13 and 14
 Glasgow Slums 1 and 2
 Glastonbury
 Glossop
 Gloucester 1 and 2
 Goldsithney
 Good Easter
 Goole
 Gorey
 Gorleston
 Gosport
 Gotham
 Gourdon
 Govan
 Gowerton
 Grand Rocque
 Grangemouth
 Grangetown
 Grantham
 Gravesend
 Grays
 Great Easton
 Great Harwood
 Great Horton
 Great Marlow
 Grecian
 Greenock
 Green Street
 Greenwich
 Grimsby 1 and 2
 Guildford
 Guisborough
 Guiseley
 Gunnislake

H
 Hackney Wick
 Hadleigh Circle
 Haggerston
 Halesworth
 Halesowen
 Halifax 1 and 2
 Halstead
 Hamilton
 Hammersmith
 Hampstead
 Hanley
 Hanwell
 Harborne
 Harefield
 Harlesden
 Harleston
 Harpenden
 Harrington Circle
 Harrogate
 Harrow
 Hartlepool
 Harwich
 Hastings 1,2 and 3
 Hatfield Peverel
 Haverfordwest
 Haverhill
 Hawick
 Haworth
 Hayle
 Haydock
 Hazel Grove
 Healey
 Hebburn
 Heckmondwike
 Hednesford
 Helensboro
 Helston
 Hemel Hempstead
 Hendon
 Henley
 Heolfach
 Hereford
 Herts and Beds Battery
 Hestensetter
 Hetton-le-Hole
 Hexham
 Heywood
 Higham
 High Barnet
 Highbridge
 Higher Ince
 Highgate
 High Wycombe
 Hinckley
 Hirwain
 Histon
 Hitchin
 Hoddesdon
 Hollinwood
 Holloway 1 and 2
 Holt
 Holyhead
 Holywood
 Homerton
 Hoo
 Horbury
 Horsforth
 Horsham
 Horwich
 Houghton Regis
 Houghton-le-Spring
 Hounslow
 Howden
 Howden-on-Tyne
 Hoyland
 Hoyland Common
 Hucknall
 Huddersfield
 Hull 1,2,3,4,5 and 7
 Hunstanton
 Huntingdon
 Hyde
 Hylton
 Hythe

I
 Idle
 Ilfracombe
 Ilkeston
 Innerleithen
 Inverness
 Ipswich 1, 2 and 3
 Ironbridge
 Irthlingborough
 Irvine
 Islington
 Ivinghoe

J
 Jarrow
 Jersey Slums
 Johnstone

K
 Keighley
 Kelsall
 Kelso
 Kendal
 Kenilworth
 Kenmay
 Kennington Lane
 Kensal Rise
 Keswick
 Kettering
 Kidderminster
 Kidsgrove
 Kilbirnie
 Kilburn
 Kilmarnock
 Kilsyth
 Kilwinning
 Kimberley
 King's Cross
 King's Lynn
 Kingston upon Thames
 Kingsbridge
 Kingswood
 Kirkby Folly
 Kirkaldy 1 and 2
 Kirkintilloch
 Kirkwall
 Knaresborough
 Knottingley

L
 Laisterdyke
 Lamberhead Green
 Lambeth Slums
 Lanark
 Lancaster
 Langholm
 Larkhall
 Lasswade
 La Trinité
 Launceston
 Lavenham
 Leamington Spa
 Leeds 1,2,3,4,5,6,8 and 10
 Leeds Slumbs
 Leek
 Leicester 1,2,3 and 4
 Leigh
 Leighton Buzzard
 Leiston
 Leith
 Leith Slums
 Leominster
 Lerwick
 Leslie
 Lewes
 Lewisham
 Leyton
 Leytonstone
 Ligoniel
 Limavady
 Limehouse
 Lincoln 1 and 2
 Linlithgow
 Linton
 Lisburn
 Liskeard
 Litcham
 Littleborough
 Little Lever
 Littleport
 Liverpool 1,2,3,4,5,6,7,8,9,10 and 11 (Liverpool 12,13,14,15,16,17,18,19 and 20 opened between 1902 and 1999)
 1 (Toxteth), 
 2 (Walton), 
 3 (Bootle), 
 4 (Breckfield, renamed Liverpool Beacon in 1980), situated in Everton
 5 (Roscommon Street, later renamed Liverpool China Street after the corps relocated, and then Liverpool Everton),
 6 (Temple, later renamed Liverpool Congress Hall, also unofficially known as Liverpool Central Corps),
 7 (Seaforth),
 8 (Toxteth Park, later renamed Liverpool Dingle),
 9 (Kensington),
10 (Waterloo),
11 (Edge Hill),
 OPENED AFTER 1900
12 (Garston),
13 (Old Swan),
14 (Aintree)
15 (Clubmoor),
-- (Knotty Ash) (Bared the Liverpool name, but didn't have a Liverpool number)
16 (Tuebrook),
-- (Wavertree) (Bared the Liverpool name, but didn't have a Liverpool number)
17 (Speke),
18 (Belle Vale),
19 (Childwall Valley),
20 (Stoneycroft),
Also records from The Salvation Army International Heritage Centre of Liverpool Stancombe Corps. There was a small corps in Kirkby which didn't bare a Liverpool name or number as it wasn't considered part of the City of Liverpool when it opened.
 Liverpool Slums 1,2 and 3
 Llanberis
 Llanelli
 Llanhilleth
 Llandidloes
 Llanrwst
 Lochee
 Lockerbie
 Loddon
 Long Eaton
 Long Sutton
 Longton
 Longtown
 Looe
 Loose
 Loughborough
 Loughborough Junction
 Louth
 Lower Broughton
 Lower Ince
 Ludlow
 Lurgan
 Luton 1 and 2
 Lutterworth
 Lye
 Lymington
 Lychett

M
 Macclesfield
 Macduff
 Maerdy
 Maesteg
 Magherafelt
 Maidenhead
 Maidstone
 Maldon
 Malmesbury
 Malton
 Malvern
 Manchester 
 1 (Temple), 
 2 (Star Hall), 
 3 (Openshaw), 
 4 (Miles Platting), 
 5 (Bradford Road),
 6 (Newton Heath),
 7 (Gorton),
 8 (Harpurhey),
 9 (Hightown),
10 (Hulme),
11 (Moss Side),
12 (Longsight),
13 (Greenheys)
 Manchester Slums
 Manor Park
 Mansfield
 March
 Margate
 Market Harborough
 Market Lavington
 Market Rasen
 Marlborough
 Marsden
 Marylebone
 Maryport
 Masborough
 Maybole
 Melbourne
 Melksham
 Merthyr Tydfil
 Metheringham
 Methwold
 Mevagissey
 Mexborough
 Middlesbrough 1,2,3 and 5
 Middlestown Circle
 Middleton Junction
 Middlewick
 Midsomer Norton
 Milford
 Millom
 Millwall Slums
 Milngavie
 Milnthorpe
 Milton
 Minster
 Misterton
 Mitcham
 Monifieth
 Montrose
 Morecambe
 Morley
 Morriston
 Motherwell
 Mountain Ash
 Mousehole
 Murton
 Mussleborough

N
 Nailsworth
 Nantwich
 Nantymoel
 Narberth
 Neath
 Nelson
 Newark
 New Barnet
 New Basford
 New Brompton
 Newbury
 Newcastle 1,2,3 and 5
 Newcastle Slums
 Newcastle-under-Lyme
 Newhaven
 Newington
 New Lenton
 Newlyn
 New Mains
 New Mills
 Newmilns Circle
 Newport 1 and 2
 Newport, IoW
 Newport Pagnell
 New Rothwell
 Newry
 New Southgate
 Newton Abbot
 Newtownards
 Newtown, Dorset
 Newtown, Monmouthshire
 Neyland, Pembrokeshire
 Nine Elms
 Norland Castle
 Normanton 1 and 2
 Northampton 1,2,3 and 4
 Northampton Battery
 Northallerton 
 Northleach
 North Shields
 North Somercotes
 North Walsham
 Northwich
 Norton Circle
 Norwich 1,2 and 3
 Nottingham 1,2,3 and 4
 Nottingham Slums
 Nottingham Battery
 Notting Hill
 Nuneaton
 Nunhead

O
 Oakengates
 Oakhampton
 Old Basford
 Oldbury
 Old Ford
 Oldham 1 (Citadel), 2 (Lees Road) and 3 (Hope Street)
 Oswestry
 Otley
 Ottery St Mary
 Ovenden
 Owston Ferry
 Oxford 1 and 2
 Oxfordshire Battery

P
 Padiham
 Paignton
 Paisley 1 and 2
 Parkgate
 Parkhead
 Parson's Drove
 Partick
 Peckham 1 and 2
 Peebles
 Peel
 Pembroke
 Pembroke Dock
 
 Pendlebury
 Pendleton
 Penge
 Penicuik
 Penrith
 Penryn
 Pensford
 Penshaw
 Pensilva
 Pentonville
 Pentre
 Penzance
 Perth
 Peterborough
 Peterhead
 Pill
 Plaistow
 Plumstead 1 and 2
 Plymouth 1,2 and 3
 Plympton
 Pokesdown
 Pollokshaws
 Ponders End
 Pontefract
 Pontycymmer
 Pontypool
 Pontypridd
 Poole
 Poplar
 Portadown
 Port Glasgow
 Porth
 Portland
 Portmadoc
 Portobello
 Portslade
 Portsmouth 1,2 and 3
 Potton
 Prescot
 Preston 1 and 2
 Preston Battery
 Prince's End
 Pudsey
 Pulborough

R
 Radcliffe
 Rainham
 Ramsbottom
 Ramsbury
 Ramsey
 Ramsgate
 Ravensthorpe
 Rawtenstall
 Reading 1,2 and 3
 Redditch
 Redhill
 Redruth
 Reepham
 Regent Hall
 Renfrew
 Retford
 Rhos
 Richmond
 Ringwood
 Ripley
 Rishton
 Rochdale 1 (Citadel) and 2 (Shawclough)
 Rock Ferry
 Romford
 Romsey
 Rotherham
 Rotherhithe
 Rothesay
 Rothwell
 Rudgwick
 Rugby
 Runcorn
 Rushden
 Rutherglen
 Ryde
 Rye

S
 Sheringham, Norfolk
 Skewen
 Southampton Shirley
 Southampton Sholing
 Sunderland 1, 2, 3, 4, 5, 6, and 7
 1 (Citadel), 
 2 (Monkwearmouth), 
 3 (Southwick-on-Wear), 
 4 (Hendon, Sunderland), 
 5 (Pallion),
 6 (Ballast Hills),
 7 (Millfield, Tyne and Wear),
 Also corps in (Grangetown, Sunderland), (Ryhope), (Houghton-le-Spring), (Hetton-le-Hole), (Washington, Tyne and Wear), (Easington Lane), (Penshaw) and (South Hylton). These did not bear Sunderland corps status or numbers as before 1900, these places were not classed as suburbs of Sunderland.
 Swansea 1, 2, 3, 4

T
 Tadcaster
 Tadley Circle
 Tamworth
 Tarvin
 Taunton
 Tavistock
 Tayport
 Teddington
 Tenby
 Tonbridge
 Tunbridge Wells

W
 West Drayton Circle
 West Hartlepool

References
"The Officer" magazine, May 1900.

The Salvation Army
Salvation Army 1900
Salvation Army